Southern Leyte's at-large congressional district refers to the lone congressional district of the Philippines in the province of Southern Leyte. It was represented in the House of Representatives of the Philippines 1961 until 2022. Southern Leyte first elected a single representative provincewide at-large representative for the 5th Congress of the Third Philippine Republic following its creation as a regular province separate from Leyte under Republic Act No. 2227 on May 22, 1959. Before 1959, its territory was represented as part of Leyte's at-large, 2nd and 3rd districts. Between 1978 and 1984, multi-seat regional delegations were formed in lieu of provinces for the Fourth Philippine Republic parliament known as the Interim Batasang Pambansa, with Southern Leyte forming part of the ten-seat Region VIII's at-large district. It was restored as a single-member district in 1984.

On February 1, 2019, Republic Act No. 11198 was signed, reapportioning Southern Leyte into two legislative districts. Due to time constraints, election to fill the seats were not fulfilled in the May 2019 election, and lone district had have a holdover position. It was instead administered in 2022.

Representation history

Election results

2016

2013

2010

See also
Legislative districts of Southern Leyte

References

Congressional districts of the Philippines
Politics of Southern Leyte
1961 establishments in the Philippines
At-large congressional districts of the Philippines
Congressional districts of Eastern Visayas
Constituencies established in 1961